Kai Colin Fotheringham (born 18 April 2003) is a Scottish professional footballer who plays as a forward for Dundee United. He made his senior debut for Dundee United in 2020 and has also spent time on loan with Falkirk, Raith Rovers, Cove Rangers and Stirling Albion.

Club career
Fotheringham joined Dundee United at youth level. In August 2020 he extended his contract with the club until 2023. He made his senior debut in a 6-2 win against Brechin City in a Scottish League Cup match on 7 October 2020. His league debut was in a 5-1 Scottish Premiership defeat against St Mirren on 27 January 2021.

Fotheringham was loaned to League One club Falkirk in March 2021 and made his debut for them against Montrose on 20 March. Three days later he scored a late winning goal in Falkirk's Scottish Cup tie against Arbroath after coming on as a substitute.

In July 2021, Fotheringham joined Championship club Raith Rovers on a season-long loan. On 2 February 2022, Fotheringham joined Scottish League One side Cove Rangers on loan for the remainder of the 2021–22 season. He was then loaned to Stirling Albion in August 2022 but would be recalled six months later, continuing his development with the Dundee United first-team.

International career
Fotheringham represented Scotland at under-16 level, playing against Australia in 2019.

Career statistics

References

External links

Living people
2003 births
Scottish footballers
Association football forwards
Dundee United F.C. players
Scottish Professional Football League players
Scotland youth international footballers
Falkirk F.C. players
Raith Rovers F.C. players
Cove Rangers F.C. players
Stirling Albion F.C. players